Nine Stories may refer to:

 Nine Stories (Nabokov), a collection of stories by Russian writer Vladimir Nabokov, released in 1947
 Nine Stories (Salinger), a collection of short stories by American writer J. D. Salinger, released in 1953
 Nine Stories, an American band  formed by singer-songwriter Lisa Loeb